Hääväki saapuu is the debut album by Finnish band Elokuu. It was released on 6 April 2012. In its first week of release, the album peaked at number two on the Finnish Album Chart.

Singles

Three singles were released from the album; "Soutaa huopaa" peaked at number two on the Finnish Singles Chart, while "Saatilla" reached number eight. The third single "Kullankaivaja" failed to chart. Accompanying music videos were released for each of the singles.

Track listing

Chart performance

References

2012 debut albums
Finnish-language albums
Elokuu albums